Jason Chia-Seng Chang is a Taiwanese physicist. 

Chang earned a bachelor's degree in physics from National Tsing Hua University in 1978. He subsequently obtained a master's degree in the subject from Marquette University in 1983, followed by a doctorate at Arizona State University (ASU) in 1988. Chang remained at ASU as a postdoctoral researcher before joining Academia Sinica's  in 1991. He later served as director of the Institute of Physics. Chang holds a joint appointment as a professor within National Taiwan University's department of physics.

In 2012, Chang was elected a fellow of the American Physical Society, "[f]or long lasting contribution in surface sciences and nanotechnology research, and innovative developments on scanning probe microscopy, UHV TEM-STM combined system for in-situ nanoscale observation and measurements, and the development of phase plate and wet cell for TEM for biological imaging."

References

Living people
Year of birth missing (living people)
Taiwanese expatriates in the United States
Arizona State University alumni
Marquette University alumni
National Tsing Hua University alumni
20th-century Taiwanese physicists
21st-century Taiwanese physicists
Fellows of the American Physical Society